Lock and Dam No. 3 is a lock and dam located near Red Wing, Minnesota on the Upper Mississippi River around river mile 796.9. It was constructed and placed in operation July 1938. The site underwent major rehabilitation from 1988 through 1991. The lock and dam is owned and operated by the St. Paul District of the United States Army Corps of Engineers-Mississippi Valley Division.

Today, many types of vessels use the lock which annually passes more than 11 million tons of cargo, including farm products, chemicals and crude materials as the main items shipped. Each year more than 20,000 recreational craft use Lock 3, making it one of the most popular locks on the river. Also, a number of boats involved with fishing tournament utilize the lock.

See also
 Public Works Administration dams list
 Prairie Island Indian Community

References

External links
U.S. Army Corps of Engineers, St. Paul District Lock and Dam 3
U.S. Army Corps of Engineers, St. Paul District: Lock and Dam 3 brochure

Mississippi River locks
Driftless Area
Buildings and structures in Goodhue County, Minnesota
Buildings and structures in Pierce County, Wisconsin
Dams in Minnesota
Dams in Wisconsin
Historic American Engineering Record in Minnesota
Historic American Engineering Record in Wisconsin
United States Army Corps of Engineers dams
Transport infrastructure completed in 1938
Roller dams
Gravity dams
Dams on the Mississippi River
Mississippi Valley Division
Locks of Minnesota
Locks of Wisconsin